Rareș Ștefănuț Lazăr (born 28 March 1999) is Romanian professional footballer who plays as a midfielder for FC Brașov, on loan from Rapid București. Lazăr made his Liga I debut on 17 May 2014 for FC Vaslui in a 0-2 defeat against Ceahlăul Piatra Neamț, being, at 15 years, 1 month and 19 days, the second youngest player who made his debut in the first league, after Nicolae Dobrin. He also entered in the history as FC Vaslui youngest player in an official match.

Career Statistics

Club

References

External links
 

1999 births
Living people
Sportspeople from Vaslui
Romanian footballers
Association football midfielders
Liga I players
FC Vaslui players
Liga II players
CS Mioveni players
FC Rapid București players
SSU Politehnica Timișoara players
FC Brașov (2021) players